Les Hazelwood (9 September 1920 – 21 January 1996) was an  Australian rules footballer who played with South Melbourne and St Kilda in the Victorian Football League (VFL).

Notes

External links 

1920 births
1996 deaths
Australian rules footballers from Victoria (Australia)
Sydney Swans players
St Kilda Football Club players